Curtis Scott Bramble is an American politician and Certified Public Accountant serving as a member of the Utah State Senate, representing the state's 24th senate district. Prior to redistricting he represented the 16th senate district in Provo.

Early life and career
Bramble was born and raised in Chicago, Illinois, where he graduated from Crown High School. He grew up as a Methodist and joined the Church of Jesus Christ of Latter-day Saints while attending Notre Dame University. After Notre Dame, Bramble attended Brigham Young University, where he graduated with a B.S in and M.S. in accounting.

Career 
Bramble worked as a Certified Public Accountant in Utah. Bramble was appointed as the Advisory Committee Chairman for Medical Cannabis Payment Solutions, a Las Vegas Company specializing in providing end-to-end management, across multiple management systems, for medicinal marijuana operations.

Utah Senate 
Bramble was elected to the Utah Senate in 2000 and took office in January 2001. He initially served on the Business, Labor and Economic Development, and Revenue and Taxation Standing Committees; and on the Health and Human Services Joint Appropriation Committee. In 2004, Bramble became the Majority Leader of the Utah Senate for the 57th Utah Legislature and the Co-Chair of the Retirement and Independent Entities Joint Appropriation Committee. He also served on the Executive Offices and Criminal Justice, and Higher Education Joint Appropriations committees and Chaired the Retirement and Independent Entities Standing Committee. He also served on the Revenue and Taxation Committee for the 57th Utah State Legislature. Bramble was reelected to his third term to the Utah Senate in November 2008, defeating Democrat Radene Hatfield.

Senator Bramble is currently up for reelection and has two challengers in the primary.

Committee assignments 
 Business, Economic Development, and Labor Appropriations Subcommittee
 Executive Offices and Criminal Justice Appropriations Subcommittee
 Retirement and Independent Entities Appropriations Subcommittee
 Senate Business and Labor Committee (Chair)
 Senate Retirement and Independent Entities Committee
 Senate Revenue and Taxation Committee

In 2008, Bramble received the National Legislator of the Year Award from the American Legislative Exchange Council (ALEC) and he has served on the board of directors of ALEC. Bramble served as president of the National Conference of State Legislatures from 2015 to 2016.

Notable legislation 
In 2014, Bramble sponsored S.B. 54 Second Substitute Elections Amendments. The enacted bill allows for an optional open primary. During the 2016 legislative session Senator Bramble passed a bill that would require doctors to give anesthesia to fetuses during an abortion after 20 weeks of pregnancy.

Float building controversy
The Deseret Morning News and Salt Lake Tribune called for an ethics investigation into an incident involving Bramble, Representative Becky Lockhart and Mountainland Technical College (known at time as the Mountainland Applied Technology College). Allegedly Bramble and Lockhart asked the college to build the Republican party a float to use in parades. The college used its money to pay for the float which, the papers alleged, violated Utah law, e.g., that "a public entity may not make expenditures from public funds for political purposes." When questions arose, college President Clay Christensen told State Auditor Auston Johnson he was under "tremendous pressure" by the Utah County GOP and lawmakers to build the float, but later that same day, after a conversation with Bramble, he changed his statement. Bramble first denied speaking with Christiansen but later acknowledged he "may have called," but couldn't "recall what was said." No investigation ensued.

Personal life 
Bramble lives in Provo with his wife Susan. He has six children and 12 grandchildren.

Electoral results
Senator Bramble is up for election in 2016 and currently has two challengers in the primary.

See also
 54th Utah State Legislature

References

External links
 
 

Legislative Information
 Map of Utah Senate District 16
 Official Legislative Biography
 Project Vote Smart Biography

Voting Record
 Interest Group Ratings at Project Vote Smart
 Voting Record at Project Vote-Smart

Latter Day Saints from Illinois
Brigham Young University alumni
Converts to Mormonism from Methodism
Living people
University of Notre Dame alumni
Republican Party Utah state senators
21st-century American politicians
Latter Day Saints from Indiana
Latter Day Saints from Utah
Year of birth missing (living people)